Made in Jersey is an American legal drama television series that aired on CBS from September 28 to December 29, 2012. The network ordered the series in May 2012. On October 10, 2012, after only two episodes aired, it was canceled and removed from the network's schedule, making it the first canceled series of the 2012–13 television season. On November 5, 2012, it was announced that CBS had planned to burn off the remaining six episodes beginning Saturday, November 24.

Premise
A streetwise attorney, born and raised in New Jersey in a close Italian-American family, makes the transition from the state prosecutor's office in Trenton to a posh New York City law firm, where she must defend her clients while surviving her colleagues' skepticism.

Cast and characters

Main
 Janet Montgomery as Martina Garretti, a streetwise, first-year lawyer born and raised in a blue collar family in New Jersey who gets a job at the high powered law firm of Stark & Rowan in New York. She was an ex-assistant district attorney.
 Toni Trucks as Cyndi Vega, Martina's secretary at the firm and her best friend.
 Erin Cummings as Bonnie Garretti, Martina's older sister who works as a manicurist.
 Felix Solis as River Brody, the firm's investigator who helps Martina with her cases and is a former Los Angeles Police Department detective.
 Kyle MacLachlan as Donovan Stark, a founding partner at Stark & Rowan.
 Kristoffer Polaha as Nolan Adams, a third-year associate at the firm.
 Megalyn Echikunwoke as Riley Prescott, a second-year associate at the firm who is the daughter of the former United States Ambassador to Sweden and Martina's foil.
 Donna Murphy as Darlene Garretti, Martina's mother.

Pablo Schreiber as Luke Aronson, a lawyer at the firm who was Martina's love interest, and Stephanie March as Natalie Minka, an established lawyer at the firm who is turned off by Martina's style, were originally cast as series regulars but only appeared in the pilot. They were replaced by Polaha and Echikunwoke, respectively.

Recurring
 Jessica Blank as Deb Garretti Keenan, Martina's married older sister 
 Michael Drayer as Albert Garretti, Martina's brother
 Lewis Grosso as Joseph Keenan, Martina's brother-in-law
 Joseph Siravo as Gavin Garretti, Martina's brother
 Drew Beasley as Charlie Garretti, Martina's brother
 Nicolette Pierini as Annika Keenan

Episodes

International broadcasts
In Canada, the show has been picked up by Global Television Network, where it aired on the same night as the American broadcast, but at different times depending on the region and simultaneous substitution opportunities. In Portugal, it premiered on TVSéries on October 18, 2012.

Critical reception
The show was met with mixed reviews from critics, with a score of 43 out of 100 based on 18 reviews from Metacritic. Despite stating that it "sounds from a bare-bones description as if it were a cloddish comedy that deserves immediate cancellation," Neil Genzlinger of The New York Times added that "if the show's writers can deepen the characters, Made in Jersey just might continue to be worth watching."

References

External links
  via the Wayback Machine
 

2010s American workplace drama television series
2012 American television series debuts
2012 American television series endings
2010s American legal television series
CBS original programming
English-language television shows
Television series by CBS Studios
Television series by Sony Pictures Television
Television shows set in New Jersey
Television shows set in New York City